Kushlawa is a village in the Jodhpur district of the Indian state of Rajasthan. This village comes under Phalodi tehsil. According to the 2011 Census, the village population is 787.

Reference

Villages in Jodhpur district